Momordica enneaphylla is a species of plant in the family Cucurbitaceae. It is found in Cameroon, the Democratic Republic of the Congo, and Gabon. Its natural habitats are subtropical or tropical moist lowland forests and subtropical or tropical swamps. It is threatened by habitat loss.

References

enneaphylla
Vulnerable plants
Taxonomy articles created by Polbot
Taxa named by Alfred Cogniaux